The 2011–12 Pepperdine Waves men's basketball team represented Pepperdine University in the 2011–12 NCAA Division I men's basketball season. This was the head coach Marty Wilson's first full season at Pepperdine, though he was the team's interim head coach in the 1990s for half of a season. The Waves played their home games at the Firestone Fieldhouse and are members of the West Coast Conference. They finished the season 10–19, 4–12 in WCC play to finish in seventh place and lost in the second round of the West Coast Conference tournament to San Diego.

Roster

Schedule and results
Source

|-
!colspan=9| Exhibition

|-
!colspan=9| Regular season

|-
!colspan=9| 2012 West Coast Conference men's basketball tournament

References

Pepperdine Waves men's basketball seasons
Pepperdine
Pepperdine Waves Men's Basketball
Pepperdine Waves Men's Basketball